In September 2005, Stratford, Ontario hosted the Ovation Music Festival, organized by local renowened Concert Producer Chris Parson. Local musicians opened for several big name Canadian groups including Sum 41, Simple Plan,  Our Lady Peace and Barenaked Ladies.

History

The 2005 Ovation Music Festival opened with the performances of Sum 41 and Simple Plan on the Friday Night. The following night, the festival attracted a slightly larger crowd with entertainers like Sloan, Finger Eleven and Our Lady Peace. On the closing day and evening, the festival diversified its musical offerings even more, reaching out to a wide audience range with various musical tastes that included Fefe Dobson, Divine Brown, k-os and the Barenaked Ladies.

The 2006 festival continued with an all-Canadian line-up. The 2006 Ovation Music Festival opened on the Friday with performances by Stabilo, Hedley, Sloan and the only headlining appearance in Canada in 2006 by Nelly Furtado. The Saturday night attracted a large audience with performances by Bobnoxious, controller.controller, Hawksley Workman and an amazing performance by The Tragically Hip. On the closing day (Sunday), the festival continued with a diverse selection with performances by local acts Dayna Manning and Brittlestar along with jacksoul, Ron Sexsmith, Jim Cuddy Band and legendary Canadian artists Randy Bachman and Burton Cummings from The Guess Who.

External links
The Ovation Music Festival

Rock festivals in Canada
Music festivals in Ontario
Festivals in Stratford, Ontario
Music festivals established in 2005
Tourist attractions in Perth County, Ontario